Jeeva Ravi is an Indian actor, casting director and television actor who has worked in Tamil-language films and television. He made a breakthrough as an actor with his performances in 3 (2012) and Jeeva (2014), with the latter film being a prefix for his stage name.

Career
Ravi is the grandson of film producer G. M. Velumani, who made films in the 1950s and 1960s. Ravi began his career as a casting director, before acting in serials in STAR Vijay and Sun TV. He gradually moved on to feature in films and got his first major breakthrough by portraying Shruti Haasan's father in Aishwarya Dhanush's drama film, 3 (2012). He subsequently appeared in more prominent roles in his following ventures, before gaining critical acclaim for his portrayal of a cricket coach in Suseenthiran's Jeeva (2014). The success of the film meant that he adapted 'Jeeva' as a prefix to his name and continued to play pivotal roles as a collector in AR Murugadoss's Kaththi (2014) and a commissioner in Kaaki Sattai (2015). He also starred in a movie directed by Shakti Soundar Rajan, Miruthan (2016).

Television 

Web Series

Filmography

References

External links

Living people
Tamil male actors
Tamil male television actors
Television personalities from Tamil Nadu
Male actors in Tamil cinema
21st-century Tamil male actors
Year of birth missing (living people)